Vladislav Nikolayevich Rybin (born 22 March 1978) is a former Russian professional football player.

Club career
He played in the Russian Football National League for FC Dynamo Bryansk in 2004.

References

External links
 

1978 births
People from Ulyanovsk Oblast
Living people
Russian footballers
Association football forwards
Association football midfielders
FC Khimik-Arsenal players
FC Dynamo Bryansk players
FC Lukhovitsy players
Sportspeople from Ulyanovsk Oblast